Bensberg is an underground and terminus station on the Cologne Stadtbahn line 1, located in Bergisch Gladbach. The station lies at Steinstraße in the district of Bensberg.

The station was opened in 2000 and consists of a mezzanine and one island platform with two rail tracks.

Notable places nearby 
 Bergisches Museum für Bergbau
 Schloss Bensberg

See also 
 List of Cologne KVB stations

References

External links 
 
 station info page 
 station layout map 

Cologne KVB stations
Bergisch Gladbach
Railway stations in Germany opened in 2000